The Barnwell and Searchlight Railway is a defunct  short-line railroad that operated from 1906 to 1911.  The railroad ran from Barnwell, California to Searchlight, Nevada.  It was always operated by the Atchison, Topeka and Santa Fe Railway.

Construction of line
The discovery of gold in Searchlight, Nevada in 1897 led to a gold rush in the area.  In 1900 the Quartette Mining Company was formed and two years later the area was booming with activity and peaking in 1907 at a population of 5,000.  It was at the peak of this boom that the Barnwell & Searchlight Railway was formed.  

The railway was constructed between May 1, 1906 and March 31, 1907 and was built to serve the Searchlight gold mining district at Searchlight, Nevada.  On April 7, 1907, only 7 days after construction was completed the railway was leased to and became a non-operating subsidiary of ATSF.

Consolidated into California, Arizona and Santa Fe Railway
On December 28, 1911 the Barnwell & Searchlight was consolidated into ATSF's non-operating subsidiary, the California, Arizona and Santa Fe Railway.

Abandonment of line
On September 23, 1923 the line's track was washed out and was abandoned on February 18, 1924.  The town during this time was dying and by 1927 the population was only 50 people.

Timeline
April 1906 Railroad formed
May 1906 Grading begins
September 1906 Laying rails begins
March 1907 Construction completed
April 1907 Leased to ATSF as a non-operating subsidiary
December 1911 Railroad is consolidated into ATSF's non-operating subsidiary California, Arizona and Santa Fe Railway
September 1923 Line washed out
February 1924 Line abandoned

Interchange at Barnwell
At Barnwell, the Barnwell and Searchlight branched from ATSF's non-operating subsidiary, the California Eastern Railway.  The California Eastern ran south from North Ivanpah, California - Leastalk (Ivanpah on the San Pedro, Los Angeles and Salt Lake Railroad interchange) - Barnwell (Barnwell & Searchlight interchange) - Blackburn - Blake (Goffs on the ATSF mainline from Los Angeles - Needles).

Route
Barnwell (Interchange with California Eastern Railway)
Hart
Juan (Nevada)
Searchlight

See also

List of defunct California railroads
List of defunct Nevada railroads

References

 
 

Defunct Nevada railroads
Defunct California railroads
Predecessors of the Atchison, Topeka and Santa Fe Railway
Railway companies established in 1906
Railway companies disestablished in 1911
History of the Mojave Desert region
American companies established in 1906